Lloyd Daniels (born September 4, 1967) is an American former professional basketball player who played parts of five seasons in the National Basketball Association (NBA).

Early life
The  shooting guard was one of the most sought-after recruits in the nation during the 1986–87 recruiting cycle. At the time, he was considered the most talented player from New York City since Kareem Abdul-Jabbar and also compared to Connie Hawkins. According to authors John Valenti and Ron Naclerio, Daniels, nicknamed "Sweet Pea," was reputed to combine the passing ability of Magic Johnson with the shooting ability of Larry Bird.

Daniels had a somewhat troubled childhood. He grew up in a very poor area of Brooklyn, and was raised by relatives from the age of three after his mother died and his father all but abandoned him. By his senior year of high school, he had attended four or five high schools (depending on the source) in three states, and could only read at a third-grade level.

College career
Daniels attended UNLV and was slated to play on the basketball team under coach Jerry Tarkanian. One of Tarkanian's assistants, Mark Warkentien, became Daniels' legal guardian.

Daniels enrolled at Mt. San Antonio College, a junior college near Los Angeles, to improve his academics. He played one game for Mt. San Antonio's basketball team, but later quit to focus on improving his reading proficiency. However, on February 9, 1987, Daniels was arrested for buying crack cocaine from an undercover policeman. Although Tarkanian was known for taking in troubled players, this was too much even for him, and he announced days after the arrest that Daniels would never play for UNLV. It later emerged that Daniels had first been led to UNLV by Richard Perry, who had been convicted twice for sports bribery. Perry's involvement resulted in an NCAA investigation that ultimately forced Tarkanian to resign.

Professional career
Daniels bounced around in the professional ranks for the next six years, and went through drug rehabilitation three times. In 1988, he was kicked off the Continental Basketball Association's Topeka Sizzlers for not staying in shape. He signed in New Zealand with Waitemata shortly after that, only to be thrown off the team for heavy drinking. On May 11, 1989, Daniels was shot three times in the chest and survived. He still has fragments of a bullet lodged in his right shoulder. He also played in the GBA (where he was named MVP in his only season) and the USBL, before playing in Greece with AEK Athens BC and in Turkey with Galatasaray. After Tarkanian was named head coach of the San Antonio Spurs for the 1992–93 season, Daniels signed with the Spurs as a free agent.

Before he signed with the Spurs, the New York Knicks were the first NBA team to express an interest in him, but declined to sign him after flying him in for a tryout during the off-season. Daniels worked hard to get himself into NBA playing shape during the summer league, and was named the Spurs starting point guard during the preseason. Indeed, Daniels had an inspired performance against the Knicks in the preseason, dominating his hometown team with 30 points in his first game on the Spurs home court, and electrifying the crowd. In a New York Times article the next day, Tarkanian noted that a Knick scout had told him after Daniels' tryout with the Knicks that he "can't play." Despite that, Daniels graciously told reporters after the game that he appreciated the opportunity that the Knicks gave him and sounded happy finally to have the opportunity to shine in the NBA. Daniels first few months in the NBA showed that he could play with the best in the world despite all of the hurdles he had overcome to get there. In only his second NBA game, he had 26 points, 8 rebounds, 6 assists, 3 steals, and 3 block shots, demonstrating his skill and versatility. However, after Tarkanian was fired twenty games into the season, Daniels' playing time diminished, though he did score over 20 points six times during the course of the season. Daniels played one more season with the Spurs before he was let go.

Daniels managed to play intermittently over five seasons for six NBA teams: the San Antonio Spurs, Philadelphia 76ers, Los Angeles Lakers, Sacramento Kings, New Jersey Nets and Toronto Raptors. He had several shocking comebacks, including a stint with the Lakers for the 1994–95 season. Signed to a 10-day contract, he took over a tight game, scoring 20 points in the second half to lead the Lakers to victory. He ended up in the Lakers starting lineup for about 14 games that year after that scoring outburst and finished the season with the team.

Later in his professional career, after dominating play in the CBA, the Raptors signed him to a ten-day contract and he scored 22 points in his first game with the team. Despite his obvious offensive skills, he was forever considered an off court risk and an undisciplined player, and could not find a permanent home in the NBA. 
Overall, Daniels played in 200 NBA games and scored 1,411 points. He played in Italy with Scavolini Pesaro in 1995/96 season with an average of 21.6 ppg.

Daniels continued to play exhibition games for charity, joining the Jayson Williams Foundation and its exhibition team which played games across the United States. In these games, he played alongside Jayson Williams, Walter Berry and Vladimir Cuk.

In October 2005, Daniels tried to revive his career by trying out with the Strong Island Sound of the American Basketball Association.

His nickname, Swee'Pea, is a reference to the Popeye cartoon character of the same name. He lives in New Jersey where he coaches AAU basketball.

NBA career statistics

Regular season

|-
| style="text-align:left;"|
| style="text-align:left;"|San Antonio
| 77 || 10 || 20.4 || .443 || .333 || .727 || 2.8 || 1.9 || .5 || .4 || 9.1
|-
| style="text-align:left;"|
| style="text-align:left;"|San Antonio
| 65 || 5 || 15.1 || .376 || .352 || .719 || 1.7 || 1.4 || .4 || .2 || 5.7
|-
| style="text-align:left;"|
| style="text-align:left;"|Philadelphia
| 5 || 0 || 12.6 || .333 || .214 || 1.000 || 1.4 || .8 || .4 || .0 || 4.6
|-
| style="text-align:left;"|
| style="text-align:left;"|L.A. Lakers
| 25 || 15 || 21.6 || .390 || .267 || .800 || 2.2 || 1.4 || .8 || .4 || 7.4
|-
| style="text-align:left;"|
| style="text-align:left;"|Sacramento
| 5 || 0 || 5.6 || .125 || .182 ||  || .8 || .2 || .2 || .0 || 1.2
|-
| style="text-align:left;"|
| style="text-align:left;"|New Jersey
| 17 || 0 || 16.6 || .330 || .322 || .833 || 2.3 || 1.5 || .5 || .2 || 5.4
|-
| style="text-align:left;"|
| style="text-align:left;"|Toronto
| 6 || 0 || 13.7 || .414 || .222 || .800 || 1.2 || .7 || .5 || .3 || 5.7
|- class="sortbottom"
| style="text-align:center;" colspan="2"|Career
| 200 || 29 || 17.7 || .403 || .316 || .743 || 2.2 || 1.6 || .5 || .3 || 7.1

Playoffs

|-
| style="text-align:left;"|1993
| style="text-align:left;"|San Antonio
| 8 || 0 || 9.3 || .367 || .143 || .833 || 1.9 || .3 || .4 || .0 || 3.5
|-
| style="text-align:left;"|1994
| style="text-align:left;"|San Antonio
| 4 || 0 || 16.5 || .400 || .500 || 1.000 || 2.3 || .8 || .0 || .3 || 5.5
|- class="sortbottom"
| style="text-align:center;" colspan="2"|Career
| 12 || 0 || 11.7 || .380 || .333 || .875 || 2.0 || .4 || .3 || .1 || 4.2

References

External links

1967 births
Living people
AEK B.C. players
American expatriate basketball people in Canada
American expatriate basketball people in Greece
American expatriate basketball people in Italy
American expatriate basketball people in New Zealand
American expatriate basketball people in Portugal
American expatriate basketball people in Turkey
American expatriate basketball people in Venezuela
American men's basketball players
American shooting survivors
Andrew Jackson High School (Queens) alumni
Baltimore Bayrunners players
Basketball players from New York City
Fort Wayne Fury players
Galatasaray S.K. (men's basketball) players
Greek Basket League players
Idaho Stampede (CBA) players
Los Angeles Lakers players
Limoges CSP players
Mt. SAC Mounties men's basketball players
New Jersey Nets players
Parade High School All-Americans (boys' basketball)
Philadelphia 76ers players
Quad City Thunder players
Sacramento Kings players
San Antonio Spurs players
Shooting guards
Sportspeople from Brooklyn
Street basketball players
Toronto Raptors players
Trenton Shooting Stars players
Undrafted National Basketball Association players
Victoria Libertas Pallacanestro players
United States Basketball League players